Black Sheep are an English anarcho-folk band formed by singer/songwriter and counter-cultural activist Julian Cope. They are the most recent of Cope's ongoing side projects, which include Brain Donor and Queen Elizabeth.

Background and work

The origins of Black Sheep lie in Julian Cope's 2008 solo album Black Sheep, for which he assembled a varied group of contributing musicians both from his longstanding talent pool and from more recent associates. Black Sheep was a predominantly acoustic project, dominated by Cope's vocals and Mellotron playing and by varied contributions mainly played on acoustic guitars and large bass drums. Besides Cope (who also played guitars, bass guitar, synthesizer and bass drum), the album featured long-term Cope sidemen Patrick "Holy" McGrail (synthesizer) and Doggen (guitar, bass guitar, harmonica, drums and backing vocals - also of Spiritualized), plus acoustic guitarists/singers/drum beaters Michael O'Sullivan and Ady "Acoustika" Fletcher. The album also credited a "blasphemous movie division" run by "Big Nige", and a "law council" featuring McGrail, Big Nige, and "Vybik Jon".

On 27 October 2008 Cope and various Black Sheep related musicians began the "Joe Strummer Memorial Busking Tour", a 3-day-long busking tour of UK cultural centres as defined by Cope. These included several locations in London (the statues of Emily Pankhurst, Winston Churchill and Thomas Carlyle; the Wat Tyler memorial on Blackheath Common; and Karl Marx's grave in Highgate Cemetery), the Eddie Cochran memorial in Chippenham, the site of the Peterloo Massacre in Manchester, the King's Standing and Swanborough Tump barrows and Carl Jung's statue in Liverpool.

Working on Black Sheep both as an album and as a counter-cultural touring event inspired Cope to extend the concept to a full band (later described, although not by Cope, as "an assortment of the chemically damaged and the intellectually fired-up"). Acoustika, O’Sullivan and McGrail remained on board, while Vybik Jon and Big Nige stepped up as additional performers.  Also added were several new recruits - drummer Antony Hodgkinson (Antronhy), Christophe F. (formerly of Universal Panzies),  "Fat Paul" Horlick (on electronics and drums), Adam "Randy Apostle" Whittaker (who'd previously mostly worked with Cope as an engineer), and the more obscure "Hebbs" and "Common Era". All of these members played on the Black Sheep debut double album Kiss My Sweet Apocalypse, released in 2009.

Rather than being just another Cope vehicle, it became clear that Black Sheep was considered a collective effort on the evidence of the album's second half, which featured tracks led by individual group members (McGrail on the 24-minute epic "Kiss My Sweet Apocalypse" and Christophe F. on "We're The Baa-aa-aader Meinhof", "You Can Gaol The Revolutionary, But You Cannot Gaol The Revolution" and "Heathen Frontiers In Sound"). The group recorded several BBC sessions which were released the same year on Black Sheep at the BBC. Musically, this featured the same lineup as the debut album bar Whitaker and Hebbs, and with the addition of the group's engineer (singer-songwriter David Wrench) on grand piano and vocals plus additional vocalist Eddi Fiegel. Attention to the sleevenotes of the albums illustrated Black Sheep's increasingly collective approach – Fiegel also served as one of the group's photographers, while the musically absent Hebbs had contributed a painting. Other contributors to Black Sheep have included Cope's wife Dorian Cope, performing under the pseudonym of "Mother of the Revolution" (Dorian Cope's radical blog " On This Deity" is also a Black Sheep project).

The collective approach has also allowed for an increasing number of releases foregrounding individual group members and associates. Christophe F. stepped to the fore on 2009's Heathen Frontiers in Sound which he predominantly wrote while backed by the group. Black Sheep have also backed David Wrench on his 2010 album Spades, Hoes, Plows (for which they were co-credited).

Discography
As Julian Cope:
2008 Black Sheep

As Black Sheep:
2009 Kiss My Sweet Apocalypse (Invada)
2009 Black Sheep at the BBC (Fuck Off and Di)

As Christophe F./Black Sheep:
2009 Heathen Frontiers In Sound (Trilithon Records)

with David Wrench:
2010 Spades, Hoes, Plows (Invada)

References

External links
Head Heritage - Julian Cope's own site
 On This Deity – Dorian Cope's radical blog and Black Sheep project

Folk punk groups
English folk musical groups
Musical groups from Wiltshire